Angela Corcoran is the Chargé d'Affaires to Myanmar and former Australian Ambassador to Cambodia, having held the post from 2016 to the end of 2019.

Corcoran has been part of a controversy concerning a champagne toast with Cambodian Foreign Affairs Minister Prak Sokhonn in 2017.

On November 28, 2019, Corcoran told Cambodian Foreign Affairs Minister Prak Sokhonn that Australia is “committed to strengthening bilateral relations between the two countries” which includes continuing financial assistance on top of the $1 billion from 1992 to 2018.

External links
EU huffs and puffs to bring Cambodia into line

References

Australian women ambassadors
Ambassadors of Australia to Cambodia
Living people
Year of birth missing (living people)